Subcutaneous may refer to:

 Subcutaneous injection
 Subcutaneous tissue